Raqhid Jevon Render (March 16, 1998 – May 13, 2022), known professionally as Lil Keed, was an American rapper and songwriter. He was signed to Young Thug's record label YSL Records, as well as 300 Entertainment. His song "Nameless" reached number 42 on the Billboard Hip Hop/R&B Songs Airplay chart.

Early life 
Raqhid Jevon Render was born in Atlanta, Georgia, on March 16, 1998, the fifth of seven children. Render grew up in Forest Park, later moving to Atlanta on Cleveland Ave. After the death of his close friend Rudy, Render started taking rapping seriously in 2016. Render had 6 brothers and 1 sister; his younger brother is rapper Lil Gotit.

Despite his parents separating at an early age, both were present in Render's upbringing. During his teenage years, Keed worked briefly at Subway and McDonald's. Being close to a studio, Keed would record music almost on a daily basis. Render first started making music with his younger brother Semaja Render, posting songs online and scoring some regional hits in 2017. Render also had one daughter named Naychur.

Career

2018: Trapped on Cleveland 2 and Keed Talk To 'Em 
On July 23, 2018, Keed released his single "Slatt Rock" featuring Paper Lovee along with his mixtape Trapped on Cleveland 2. In October 2018, Keed and his younger brother Lil Gotit featured in fellow rapper Lil Uzi Vert's song Heavy Metal. On December 12, 2018, Lil Keed released another mixtape, Keed Talk to 'Em, which featured the main single "Nameless", as well as "Balenciaga" featuring 21 Savage, "Red Hot" featuring Trippie Redd, and others. Keed Talk to 'Em also featured Lil Durk, Lil Yachty and Brandy.

2019: Long Live Mexico 
On March 11, 2019, Keed featured in Lil Gotit's single "Drop The Top." On March 14, 2019, Keed released the song "Move It", featuring fellow Atlanta based artist Offset. On March 27, 2019, Lil Keed was nominated for the 10th spot for the XXL Freshman cover. On April 24, 2019, Keed released his single "Oh My God." On May 6, 2019, Lil Keed released "Proud Of Me", featuring Young Thug. The song, along with the previously released single "Oh My God", accompanied his forthcoming debut studio album Long Live Mexico. Keed stated the idea behind title of the album was inspired by his friend named Mexico who had died earlier in the year while Keed was on tour with Trippie Redd. On May 29, 2019, Keed released his new single "Pull Up", featuring Lil Uzi Vert and YNW Melly. The song was released from Young Thug's YSL Records and 300 Entertainment. On June 13, 2019, "Long Live Mexico" was released. It also featured artists such as Gunna, Lil Uzi Vert, Roddy Ricch, YNW Melly, and Young Thug. The album peaked at number 26 on the Billboard 200, and number 11 on the Hot Rap Albums Chart, becoming the highest charting project of his career.

On July 18, 2019, Hoodrich Pablo Juan's new single "Drip Babies" was released on which Keed alongside Lil Gotit made guest appearances. On July 23, 2019,  Lil Keed featured in Future's released single "Undefeated." On that same day, he released a music video for his Long Live Mexico single "HBS." The music video was directed by Cole Bennett. On August 14, 2019, the music video for Lil Keed and Guap Tarantino's collaborative single "Churches Peppers" was released on WorldStarHipHop. On September 3, 2019, Keed released his Mooktoven produced single "Saliva." On September 18, 2019, Keed released his single "Swap It Out" featuring Lil Duke. On October 17, 2019, a music video for Lil Gotit and Lil Keed's collaborative single "Brotherly Love" was released on behalf of Alamo Records. On November 7, 2019, 88GLAM and Lil Keed released their collaborative single "Bankroll." On November 27, 2019, a music video for Lil Keed's Long Live Mexico single "Snake" was released. On November 21, 2019, a music video of Young Scooter and Lil Keed's collaborative single "Trap Museum" was released on behalf of WMG. On December 6, 2019, Keed's collaborative single "Accomplishments" with Lil Yachty and Zaytoven was released along with a music video.

2020: Trapped on Cleveland 3 

On January 11, 2020, Keed announced his forthcoming second studio album Trapped On Cleveland 3. On January 30, 2020, Keed's collaborative single "A-Team (You Ain't Safe)" along with Lil Yachty, Lil Gotit, and Zaytoven was released. It was the second single released off their forthcoming collaborative album A-Team.

On April 15, 2020, Keed released his single "No Dealings", accompanied with a music video. On May 15, 2020, Keed released his second single  "Wavy"; however, the song did not appear on Trapped on Cleveland 3, but the remix featuring American rapper Travis Scott did. On June 12, 2020, Keed released the single "Fox 5", featuring American rapper Gunna. Gunfire rang out during the filming of the music video for the song resulting in 2 people injured. On July 31, 2020, Keed revealed the release date and cover art for Trapped on Cleveland 3. On August 3, 2020, he released another single titled "She Know", featuring American rapper Lil Baby. On August 7, 2020, Keed released his album Trapped On Cleveland 3. The album features artists such as 42 Dugg, Future, Gunna, Lil Baby, Travis Scott, Ty Dolla Sign, and Young Thug. On August 11, 2020, Keed was included on XXLs 2020 Freshman Class.

On October 27, 2020, Keed revealed the tracklist for his deluxe edition of Trapped On Cleveland 3. On October 30, 2020, he released the deluxe version with 18 more tracks featuring additional guest appearances from O.T. Genasis, Lil Gotit, Quavo, Lil Duke, Yak Gotti, and Chris Brown.

2023: Keed talk to em' 2 
Managed by his family, lil Keed's career will live forever. "Keed talk to em' 2" is the first posthumous project by Lil Keed.
On February 3, 2023, Keed released the song "Long Way To Go". On March 4, 2023, he announced the release date and the album cover on instagram. On March 8, Keed annonced the Tracklist and  the song "Self employed" on the same day. 

On March 17, 2023 "Keed Talk To Em' 2" is out, a project featuring big names like Young Thug, Trippie Redd, NAV, Lil Gotit, Cordae and many more. The album contains 20 tracks with a total duration of 1 hour and 9 minutes.

Musical styles 
According to XXL, Keed's style was frequently compared to Young Thug, as the two rappers both grew up on Cleveland Avenue and Keed was signed to YSL Records. Chicago Reader described Keed's style as similar to Young Thug's while incorporating his own distinct flow.

According to Pitchfork, Keed used elements of Young Thug's versatile flows as a foundation, specifically the high-pitched delivery.

Influences 
According to an interview by WHTA Hot 107.9, Keed stated he was inspired listening to music by his neighbor Young Thug, as well as Chingy, Peewee Longway, and Big Bank Black.

Live performances 
At the Rolling Loud Festival on May 11, 2019, in Miami, Florida, Lil Keed performed on the same stage as Young Thug, Chief Keef, Lil Wayne, and Comethazine. He was scheduled to perform at the Rolling Loud Festival in Oakland later on September 29, 2019. On September 14, 2019, Keed and Lil Gotit performed at The Novo theater in Los Angeles. Fellow rapper Drake was present and on stage alongside Keed throughout the performance. Young Thug and Lil Duke also briefly appeared on stage. On October 12, 2019, Keed performed in the Rolling Loud New York festival. Keed also performed at the A3C Festival in Atlanta on October 13, 2019. On October 27, 2019, Keed performed at the Mala Luna festival in San Antonio, Texas.

Death
Render died on May 13, 2022. It was confirmed that Render died of eosinophilia.

Discography

Studio albums

Mixtapes

Singles

As lead artist

As featured artist

Other charted songs

Guest appearances

References

External links 

Lil Keed at AllMusic
Lil Keed discography at Discogs

1998 births
2022 deaths
21st-century American rappers
21st-century American male musicians
African-American male songwriters
African-American male rappers
African-American songwriters
Atlantic Records artists
Mumble rappers
Rappers from Atlanta
Songwriters from Georgia (U.S. state)
Trap musicians